San Vito a Cavagliano is a church in Bellinzago Novarese, Italy.  The church was built in the Romanesque style. The interior is richly decorated with frescos executed in the 15th or 16th centuries by a follower of Gaudenzio Ferrari.

References
 AA. VV., La pianura novarese dal Romanico al XV secolo. Percorsi di arte e architettura religiosa, Interlinea Edizioni, Novara, 1996, p. 109-12

External links

15th-century Roman Catholic church buildings in Italy
San Vito